Proholopterus laevigatus is a species of beetle in the family Cerambycidae. It was described by Philippi and Philippi in 1859.

References

Cerambycinae
Beetles described in 1859